is a seedless and highly sweet Japanese citrus fruit that is a tangor, a hybrid of the Murcott tangor with "Kuchinotsu No. 37", which in turn is a hybrid of the Kiyomi tangor and a King tangor/Willowleaf mandarin cross, "Encore No. 2". It was registered as "Tangor Nōrin No.8" in 1998 and as "Variety registration No.9398" under the Plant Variety Protection and Seed Act
in 2001. It weighs  and has an oblate shape. The rind is thin and easily peelable. Its flavor is pleasant, aromatic, and similar to the Murcott. The fruit ripens in February. Setoka are very sweet. Sugar level is 12–13 °Bx and citric acid is low (0.8–1.0%).

Outside Japan
In South Korea, Setoka is called Cheonhyehyang (천혜향, 天惠香).

References

Citrus
Japanese fruit